Gaétan Proulx (born 27 May 1947 in Saint-Denis-de-Brompton) is a Catholic clergyman and prelate for the Roman Catholic Diocese of Gaspé in Quebec, Canada. He was appointed bishop in 2016.

See also
Catholic Church in Canada

References

Canadian Roman Catholic bishops
1947 births
Living people
People from Estrie
21st-century Canadian Roman Catholic priests